The Priests (lit. "Black Priests") is a 2015 South Korean supernatural mystery thriller film written and directed by Jang Jae-hyun, based on his award-winning short film 12th Assistant Deacon.

Plot
A young girl who belongs to Father Kim's parish becomes comatose after a hit-and-run accident caused by two priests. Father Kim suspects she is possessed by an evil spirit. Father Kim along with a rebellious young seminarian named Choi try to exorcise the demon and confine it in a piglet. Members of a Rosicrucian sect inform Father Kim that two of their priests were killed by this demon. During the exorcism, the demon manifests, inflicting unnatural bodily rashes. Choi initially runs out halfway through the exorcism attempt, but eventually decides to return, determined to finish what they started. Father Kim tells him to believe this ministry isn't in vain and the reward is in the Lord's hand (Isaiah 49:4). Choi replies by quoting Ezekiel 2:6, and affirms he is prepared now. When they try to free the girl from the demon's powerful hold, they realize that the demon they are facing is an ancient one named Malphas and is far more dangerous than they ever thought. However, they manage to confine it in the piglet, but the police arrive and try to arrest them for killing Young-shin, acting on a complaint by her extremely traumatized parents. Choi runs out with the pig, faces many obstructions but successfully drowns it in the river as instructed by Kim (Luke 8:33). Young-shin who was considered dead shows signs of life, and Father Kim's and Brother Choi's rashes disappear.

Cast
Kim Yoon-seok as Father Kim
Gang Dong-won as Deacon Choi
Park So-dam as Young-shin
Kim Eui-sung as Dean of clergy
Son Jong-hak as Monsignor 
Lee Ho-jae as Father Jeong
Nam Il-woo as Abbot 
Kim Byeong-ok as Professor Park 
Cho Soo-hyang as Agnes 
Park Woong as Bishop 
Lee Jeong-yeol as Young-shin's father 
Kim So-sook as Young-shin's mother
Jeong Ha-dam as Shaman Young-joo
Kim Soo-jin as Father Kim's younger sister
Don-Don the pig as the Pig

Reception
The film was number-one on its opening weekend, with ₩13 billion. By its third weekend, the film had grossed  at the South Korean box office.

Awards and nominations

References

External links
 

2015 films
South Korean mystery thriller films
South Korean buddy films
CJ Entertainment films
Films about exorcism
2010s mystery thriller films
South Korean supernatural thriller films
Features based on short films
Films directed by Jang Jae-hyun
2010s South Korean films
2010s Korean-language films